Haymondia is a monotypic genus of flowering plants belonging to the family Fabaceae. The only species is Haymondia wallichii.

Its native range is Nepal to China (Yunnan) and Indo-China.

References

Phaseoleae
Monotypic Fabaceae genera